The National Medal of Arts is an award and title created by the United States Congress in 1984, for the purpose of honoring artists and patrons of the arts. A prestigious American honor, it is the highest honor given to artists and arts patrons by the United States government. Nominations are submitted to the National Council on the Arts, the advisory committee of the National Endowment for the Arts (NEA), who then submits its recommendations to the White House for the President of the United States to award.  The medal was designed for the NEA by sculptor Robert Graham.

Laureates
In 1983, prior to the official establishment of the National Medal of Arts, through the President's Committee on the Arts and Humanities, President Ronald Reagan awarded a medal to artists and arts patrons.

Recipients of the National Medal of Arts
The National Medal of Arts was first awarded in 1985. It was most recently awarded in 2020.

Declined honors
In 1989, composer and conductor Leonard Bernstein refused his award, allegedly due to how a federal grant to an art show on AIDS had been revoked.

In 1992, composer and lyricist Stephen Sondheim refused his award, claiming that the NEA had "become a victim of its own and others' political infighting and is rapidly being transformed into a conduit and a symbol of censorship and repression rather than encouragement and support".

In 1997, poet Adrienne Rich refused her award as a protest against “inconsistencies” between art and “the cynical politics” of the Clinton administration.

See also
National Medal of Science
National Medal of Technology and Innovation

References

External links
National Endowment for the Arts

American awards
American patrons of the arts
Arts awards in the United States
Awards established in 1984
Culture of Washington, D.C.
Arts, National Medal of
Lists of artists
 
1984 establishments in Washington, D.C.